The secretary of state for justice is a secretary of state in the Government of the United Kingdom, with responsibility for the Ministry of Justice. The incumbent is a member of the Cabinet of the United Kingdom. Since the office's inception, the incumbent has concurrently been appointed Lord Chancellor.

The office holder works alongside the other justice ministers. The corresponding shadow minister is the shadow secretary of state for justice, and the performance of the secretary of state is also scrutinised by the Justice Select Committee.

The current justice secretary is Dominic Raab who was appointed by Rishi Sunak on 25 October 2022.

Responsibilities
Corresponding to what is generally known as a justice minister in many other countries, the justice secretary's remit includes:
 His Majesty's Prison Service in England and Wales
 Matters of probation
 Oversight of the Judiciaries of the United Kingdom
The UK’s relations with the governments of the Crown Dependencies (Guernsey, Jersey and the Isle of Man).

Creation
The then Lord Chancellor, Lord Falconer of Thoroton, was appointed to the post of Secretary of State for Justice when it was created in 2007. The office of the Secretary of State for Constitutional Affairs was abolished, along with the Department for Constitutional Affairs. The home secretary, John Reid, told Parliament that future secretaries of state for justice would be MPs rather than peers.

List of Secretaries of State

See also
Constitutional Reform Act 2005
Lord Chancellor

Notes

References

External links
The Secretary of State for Constitutional Affairs Order 2003 from HMSO
The Ministry of Justice official website

Justice

Ministerial offices in the United Kingdom
 
2007 establishments in the United Kingdom